Octahedral clusters are inorganic or organometallic cluster compounds composed of six metals in an octahedral array.  Many types of compounds are known, but all are synthetic.

Octahedral chalcogenide and halide clusters
These compounds are bound together by metal-metal bonding as well as two kinds of ligands.  Ligands that span the faces or edges of the M6 core are labeled Li, for inner (innen in the original German description), and those ligands attached only to one metal are labeled outer, or La for ausser.  Typically, the outer ligands can be exchanged whereas the bridging ligands are more inert toward substitution.

Face-capped halide clusters
The premier example is of the class is Mo6Cl142−.  This dianion is available as a variety of salts by treating the polymer molybdenum(II) chloride with sources of chloride, even hydrochloric acid.  A related example is W6Cl142− anion, which is obtained by extraction of tungsten(II) chloride.

Chalcohalide clusters
A related class of octahedral clusters are of the type M6X8L6 where M is a metal usually of group 6 or group 7, X is a ligand and more specifically an inner ligand of the chalcohalide group such as chloride or sulfide and L is an "outer ligand."  The metal atoms define the vertices of an octahedron.  The overall point group symmetry is Oh.  Each face of the octahedron is capped with a chalcohalide and eight such atoms are at the corners of a cube. For this reason this geometry is called a face capped octahedral cluster.  Examples of  this type of clusters are the Re6S8Cl64− anion.

Chevrel clusters
A well-studied class of solid-state compounds related to the chalcohalides are molybdenum clusters of the type AxMo6X8 with X sulfur or selenium and Ax an interstitial atom such as Pb.  These materials, called Chevrel phases or Chevrel clusters, have been actively studied because they are type II superconductors with relatively high critical fields.  Such materials are prepared by high temperature (1100 °C) reactions of the chalcogen and Mo metal.  Structurally related, soluble analogues have been prepared, e.g., Mo6S8(PEt3)6.

Edge-Capped Halide Clusters
With metals in group 4 or 5 a so-called edge-capped octahedral clusters are more common. Twelve halides are located along the edge of the octahedron and six are terminal.  Examples of this structure type are tungsten(III) chloride, Ta6Cl14(H2O)4, Nb6F15, and Nb6F182−.

Many of the early metal clusters can only be prepared when they incorporate interstitial atoms.  One example is Zr6CCl12.

Tin(II) clusters 
Octahedral clusters of tin(II) have been observed in several solid state compounds. The reaction of tin(II) salts with an aqueous base leads to the formation of tin(II) oxyhydroxide (Sn6O4(OH)4), the structure of which comprises discrete Sn6O4(OH)4 clusters. In Sn6O4(OH)4 clusters, the six tin atoms form an octahedral array with alternate faces of the octahedron occupied by an oxide or hydroxide moiety, each bonded in a µ3-binding mode to three tin atoms. Crystal structures have been reported for compounds with the formula Sn6O4(OR)4, where R is an alkoxide such as a methyl or ethyl group.

Recently, it was demonstrated that anionic tin(II) clusters [Sn6O8]4- may form the close packed arrays as in the case of α-Sn6SiO8, which adopts the zinc blende structure, comprising a face-centred-cubic array of [Sn6O8]4- clusters with Si4+ occupying half of the tetrahedral holes. A polymorph, β-Sn6SiO8, has been identified as a product of pewter corrosion in aqueous conditions, and is a structural analogue of wurtzite.

Electron counting in octahedral halide and chalcogenide clusters
The species Mo6Cl142− feature Mo(II) (d4) centers.  Six Mo(II) centers gives rise to a total of 24 valence electrons, or 2e/Mo-Mo vector.  More electron-deficient derivatives such as Ta6Cl184− have fewer d-electrons.  For example, the naked cluster Ta614+, the core of Ta6Cl184− would have 5(6) - 14 = 16 valence electrons.  Fewer d-electrons result in weakened M-M bonding and the extended Ta---Ta distances accommodate doubly bridging halides.

Other classes of octahedral clusters
In the area of metal carbonyl clusters, a prototypical octahedral cluster is [Fe6C(CO)16]2−, which is obtained by heating iron pentacarbonyl with sodium.  Some of the CO ligands are bridging and many are terminal.  A carbide ligand resides at the center of the cluster.  A variety of analogous compounds have been reported where some or all of the Fe centres are replaced by Ru, Mn and other metals.

Outside of carbonyl clusters, gold forms octahedral clusters.

References 

Cluster chemistry